Afonino is a rural locality (a village) in Muromtsevskoye Rural Settlement, Sudogodsky District, Vladimir Oblast, Russia. The population was 31 as of 2010.

Geography 
Afonino is located on the Voyninga River, 5 km southwest of Sudogda (the district's administrative centre) by road. Raguzino is the nearest rural locality.

References 

Rural localities in Sudogodsky District